De Molay could refer to:
Jacques de Molay, the last Grand Master of the Knights Templars
DeMolay International, Masonic youth organization for males.